The 1894 Lehigh football team was an American football team that represented Lehigh University as an independent during the 1894 college football season. In its first and only season under head coach Pudge Heffelfinger, the team compiled a 5–9 record and was outscored by a total of 242 to 120.

Schedule

References

Lehigh
Lehigh Mountain Hawks football seasons
Lehigh football